Daniel McGrath (born 7 July 1994) is an Australian professional baseball pitcher who is a free agent.

Career
McGrath began his professional career with the Melbourne Aces of the Australian Baseball League. He signed with the Boston Red Sox in 2012. He made his professional debut in 2013 with the GCL Red Sox and he was later promoted to the Class A Short Season Lowell Spinners. In 12 games (11 starts) between the two teams, he was 3–4 with a 3.54 earned run average (ERA). He spent 2014 with the Class A Greenville Drive where he compiled a 6–6 record and 4.07 ERA in 19 starts, and 2015 with the Class A-Advanced Salem Red Sox where he posted a 4-6 record and 3.87 ERA in 17 starts.

McGrath returned to Salem in 2016, collecting an 8–6 record, 4.11 ERA, and 1.19 WHIP in 19 games started. In 2017, he once again returned to Salem, posting a 4–9 record and 4.98 ERA in 85 innings. McGrath spent the 2018 season with the Double-A Portland Sea Dogs, appearing in 33 games (11 starts) with a 3–3 record and 3.63 ERA. He spent most of the 2019 season with Portland, while also making two appearances with the Triple-A Pawtucket Red Sox; overall with both teams, he appeared in 29 games (16 starts) compiling a 7–1 record with a 1.98 ERA while striking out 116 batters in  innings pitched. He became a minor-league free agent on November 2, 2020.

References

External links

SoxProspects.com

1994 births
Living people
Australian expatriate baseball players in the United States
Baseball pitchers
Greenville Drive players
Gulf Coast Red Sox players
Lowell Spinners players
Melbourne Aces players
Pawtucket Red Sox players
Portland Sea Dogs players
Salem Red Sox players
Sportspeople from Melbourne
2017 World Baseball Classic players
2023 World Baseball Classic players